Vladimir Beșleagă (born 25 July 1931) is a Moldovan writer and politician.

Biography 
Vladimir Beșleagă was born to Eugenia and Vasile Beșleagă on 25 July 1931 in Mălăiești. Vladimir Beşleagă graduated from Moldova State University in 1955. He served as member of the Parliament of Moldova. He has been a member of the Moldovan Writers' Union since 1965.

Awards 
 State Prize of the Moldavian Soviet Socialist Republic (1978)
 Honored worker of culture of the Moldavian Soviet Socialist Republic (1981)

Works 
 "Zbânţuilă", ed. Școala sovietică, 1956;
 "La fântâna Leahului",  ed. Cartea Moldovenească, 1963;
 „Zbor frânt", ed. Cartea Moldovenească, 1966;
 „Vrei să zbori la Lună?", ed. Lumina, 1972;
 „Acasă", ed. Cartea Moldovenească, 1976;
 „Acasă", ed. Literatura Artistică, 1984;
 „Durere", ed. Literatura Artistică, 1979;
 „Boli", ed. Mol.gvardia, 1983;
 „Ignat și Ana", ed. Literatura Artistică, 1979;
 „Suflul vremii", ed. Literatura Artistică, 1981;
 „Sânge pe zăpadă", ed. Literatura Artistică, 1985;
 "Viața și moartea nefericitului Filimon sau Anevoioasa cale a cunoașterii de sine", ed. Hyperion, 1992;
 "Zbor frânt", "Acasă", ed. Literatura Artistică, 1980;
 "Cumplite vremi", partea I, ed. Hyperion, 1990;
 "Zbor frânt", "Pădurea albastră", „Cel de-al treilea dacă ar fi fost acolo”, „Viața și moartea nefericitului Filimon sau Anevoioasa cale a cunoașterii de sine", ed. Hyperion, 1992;
 "Zbor frânt", "Ignat și Ana", ed. Litera, 1997.
 "Nepotul", ed. Litera, 1998;
 "Jurnal 1986-1988",ed. Prut Internaţional, 2002;
 "Cumplite vremi", ed. Litera, 2003;
 "Cruci răsturnate de regim. Mănăstirea Răciula. 1959", Chișinău, 2006;
 "Dialoguri literare", Chișinău, 2006;
 "HoțII din apartamente", Chișinău, 2006;
 "Conștiința națională sub regimul comunist totalitar (RSSM: 1956-1963)", Chișinău, 2008;
 "Dirimaga", ed. Prut Internaţional, 2009.

Bibliography 
 Literatura și arta Moldovei: Encicl. - Chișinău, 1985–1986

References

External links 
 Vladimir Beşleagă
 Beşleagă Vladimir - scriitor
 Beşleagă Vladimir
 Vladimir Beşleagă
 Vladimir BEŞLEAGĂ
 https://web.archive.org/web/20100306162816/http://assembly.coe.int/ASP/AssemblyList/AL_MemberDetails.asp?MemberID=6156
 Cine au fost şi ce fac deputaţii primului Parlament din R. Moldova (1990-1994)?
 Declaraţia deputaţilor din primul Parlament
 Site-ul Parlamentului Republicii Moldova
 Vladimir Beşleagă a fost lovit de o maşină. Scriitorul n-a fost spitalizat, dar va fi consultat de un traumatolog

1931 births
Living people
Moldovan MPs 1990–1994
Popular Front of Moldova MPs
Members of the Commission for the Study of the Communist Dictatorship in Moldova
Recipients of the Order of the Republic (Moldova)
Moldova State University